This is a list of PlayStation applications currently planned or released via the PlayStation Network.

Applications

Mobile & PC

Entertainment services

Assorted

Virtual Reality

Archaic

License regions

References

PlayStation applications
 
 
Applications
Applications
Applications